Wuhe may refer to these places in China:

Wuhe County (五河县), in Bengbu, Anhui

Towns
Wuhe, Anqing (五河), in Yuexi County, Anhui
Wuhe, Baiyin (五合), in Jingyuan County, Gansu
Wuhe, Wuwei, Gansu (五和), in Wuwei, Gansu
Wuhe, Guangdong (五和), in Guangning County, Guangdong

Townships
Wuhe Township, Henan (吴河乡), in Shangcheng County, Henan
Wuhe Township, Sichuan (五合乡), in Jianyang, Sichuan
Wuhe Township, Yunnan (五合乡), in Tengchong, Yunnan